Starksia greenfieldi, the Greenfield's blenny, is a species of labrisomid blenny endemic to the waters around the island of Tobago where it is found at depths of from . It is named after David W. Greenfield, known for his work on blenniiform fishes. This species can reach a length of  SL.

References

greenfieldi
Fish described in 2011